Fabiola Zuluaga (born 7 January 1979) is a retired tennis player from Colombia. She reached the Australian Open semifinals in 2004 and became the first Colombian tennis player to reach a Grand Slam semifinal. Zuluaga is one of the most successful tennis players that Colombia has had.

She won a record seven singles titles in Bogotá, of which four were on the WTA Tour and three on the ITF Women's Circuit. She retired from the professional tour on 9 September 2005.

WTA career finals

Singles: 6 (5 titles, 1 runner-up)

Doubles: 1 (1 runner-up)

ITF finals

Singles: 13 (9–4)

Doubles: 6 (2–4)

Singles performance timeline

* statistics correct as of 28 March 2013

References

External links
 
 
 

1979 births
Living people
People from Cúcuta
Colombian female tennis players
Olympic tennis players of Colombia
Tennis players at the 2000 Summer Olympics
Tennis players at the 2004 Summer Olympics
20th-century Colombian women
21st-century Colombian women